The Highway of Legends National Scenic Byway is an  National Scenic Byway, National Forest Scenic Byway, and Colorado Scenic and Historic Byway located in Huerfano and Las Animas counties, Colorado, USA. The byway explores the Spanish Peaks region of San Isabel National Forest, a National Natural Landmark.

Route

Gallery

See also

History Colorado
List of scenic byways in Colorado
Scenic byways in the United States

Notes

References

External links

America's Byways
America's Scenic Byways: Colorado
Colorado Department of Transportation
Colorado Scenic & Historic Byways Commission
Colorado Scenic & Historic Byways
Colorado Travel Map
Colorado Tourism Office
History Colorado
National Forest Scenic Byways

Colorado Scenic and Historic Byways
National Scenic Byways
National Scenic Byways in Colorado
National Forest Scenic Byways
National Forest Scenic Byways in Colorado
San Isabel National Forest
Transportation in Colorado
Transportation in Delta County, Colorado
Transportation in Mesa County, Colorado
Tourist attractions in Colorado
Tourist attractions in Delta County, Colorado
Tourist attractions in Mesa County, Colorado
Interstate 25
U.S. Route 160